Marie of Armagnac (c. 1420–1473) was a French noblewoman, daughter of John IV of Armagnac and his second wife, Isabella of Navarre.

Marriage and children
On 30 April 1437, Marie became the second wife of John II of Alençon. Their marriage was at the Chateau L'Isle-Jourdain. They had two surviving children:

 Catherine (1452–1505)
 René of Alençon (1454–1492).

Marie died on 25 July 1473 at Cloister Mortagne-au-Perche. Her husband died three years later, on 8 September 1476 in Paris.

Ancestors

References

Sources

|-

1473 deaths
1420 births
Duchesses of Alençon
Medieval French nobility
House of Valois-Alençon
15th-century French women
15th-century French people